Jack McGregor is an Australian rugby union player who is signed for the Melbourne Rebels in the Super Rugby competition. His position of choice is fly-half.

McGregor signed with the Melbourne Rebels after captaining NSW Schools 1st XV & Australian Schoolboys in his final year at St. Ignatius College. He would go on to turn out for the Rebels U20 side before being selected for the Australian U20s however, would not make an appearance for the top team in Super Rugby, with Jack Debrezceni & Reece Hodge the preferred No 10s. He would later be released by Melbourne in 2018 & subsequently signed with the Western Force, turning out for their NRC team instead.

Super Rugby statistics

References 

Australian rugby union players
Living people
1997 births
Rugby union fly-halves
Rugby union fullbacks
Melbourne Rising players
Melbourne Rebels players
Western Force players
Rugby union players from Sydney